Trhypochthoniidae is a family of mites belonging to the order Sarcoptiformes.

Genera

Genera:
 Afronothrus Wallwork, 1961
 Albonothrus Tseng, 1982
 Allonothrus Hammen, 1953

References

Sarcoptiformes